The Convention on the Future of the European Union, also known as the European Convention, was a body established by the European Council in December 2001 as a result of the Laeken Declaration. Inspired by the Philadelphia Convention that led to the adoption of the United States federal Constitution, its purpose was to produce a draft constitution for the European Union for the Council to finalise and adopt. The Convention finished its work in July 2003 with their Draft Treaty establishing a Constitution for Europe. See History of the European Constitution for developments after this point.

Laeken Declaration
In December 2001, when the European Council met in Laeken, a fresh declaration was adopted committing the EU to greater democracy, transparency and efficiency, and setting out the process by which a constitution could be arrived at. This was to be achieved by a convention, which was intended to comprise the main 'stakeholders', in order to examine questions about the future direction of the EU. It was to produce a "final document", which soon became the draft constitution, to be handed over to the Intergovernmental Conference, scheduled for 2004, which would finalise a new treaty.

Work
The European Convention was established with 102 members. Former French President Valéry Giscard d'Estaing was appointed Chairman, former Italian Prime Minister Giuliano Amato and former Belgian Prime Minister Jean-Luc Dehaene were appointed Vice-Chairmen. Its members were drawn from the national parliaments of member states and candidate countries, the European Parliament, the European Commission, and representatives of heads of state and government. The Convention met for the first time in February 2002, and met thereafter in plenary session once or twice per month. It deliberated in public in the European Parliament building in Brussels.

The 13 member præsidium of the convention consisted of the chairman and vice-chairmen along with:

Government Representatives: Ana de Palacio y del Valle-Lersundi (Spain - PP); Henning Christophersen (Denmark - Venstre); Georgios Katiforis (Greece - PASOK).

European Commission Representatives: Michel Barnier - UMP; António Vitorino - PS

European Parliament Representatives: Klaus Hänsch - SPD; Íñigo Méndez de Vigo y Montojo - PP

National Parliament Representatives: Gisela Stuart, Labour Party UK; John Bruton, FG Ireland

Invitee: Alojz Lojze Peterle - NSi (Slovenia)

See also 
 Conference on the Future of Europe (2019 / 2020–2022)

 European Convention (1999–2000) which drafted the: Charter of Fundamental Rights of the European Union (2000 / 2009)

References

External links
 European Convention (official website, no longer updated)

Treaty establishing a Constitution for Europe
Constitutional conventions (political meeting)
Diplomatic conferences in Belgium
21st-century diplomatic conferences (Europe)
2001 in international relations
2001 in the European Union
Valéry Giscard d'Estaing